Annette and the Blonde Woman (French: Annette et la dame blonde) is a 1942 French comedy film directed by Jean Dréville and starring Louise Carletti, Henri Garat and Mona Goya. It was made by the German-controlled Continental Films in occupied Paris.

Cast
 Louise Carletti as Annette  
 Henri Garat as Maurice  
 Mona Goya as Myriam  
 Georges Rollin as Bernard  
 Marcelle Rexiane as Madame Barnavon  
 Georges Chamarat as Monsieur Barnavon  
 Rosine Luguet as Gigi  
 Simone Valère as Lucette 
 Raymonde La Fontan as Marie-Louise 
 Albert Broquin as Le clochard  
 Henry Darbray as Le juge d'instruction  
 Paul Faivre as Le maire  
 Eugène Frouhins
 Henry Gerrar as Le concierge du Trianon 
 Georges Gosset 
 Albert Malbert as Le gardien de prison  
 Pierre Palau as Le photographe  
 Robert Rollis as Le groom  
 Eugène Yvernès as L'agent du commissariat

References

Bibliography 
 Moeller, Felix. The Film Minister: Goebbels and the Cinema in the Third Reich. Edition Axel Menges, 2000.

External links 
 

1942 films
1942 comedy films
French comedy films
1940s French-language films
Films based on works by Georges Simenon
Films based on Belgian novels
Films directed by Jean Dréville
French black-and-white films
Continental Films films
1940s French films